Girl Hunting (Persian: Shekare khanegi) is a 1951 Iranian comedy film directed by Sadegh Bahrami and Ali Daryabegi.

Cast
 Sadegh Bahrami 
 Asghar Tafakori

References

Bibliography 
 Mohammad Ali Issari. Cinema in Iran, 1900-1979. Scarecrow Press, 1989.

External links 
 

1951 films
Iranian comedy films
1950s Persian-language films
1951 comedy films
Iranian black-and-white films